The list of teams and cyclists in the 2007 Vuelta a España contains the professional road bicycle racers who compete at the 2007 Vuelta a España from September 1 to September 23, 2007.

References

2007 Vuelta a España
2007